Sheshrao Krishnarao Wankhede (24 September 1914 in Nagpur – 30 January 1988 in Mumbai) was a cricket administrator and politician.

Early life
Wankhede had his early college education in Nagpur and entered the bar in England. On his return, he started practice in Nagpur. In the 1940s, he entered politics and was jailed for taking part in the Indian freedom struggle.

Political career
He was elected to the Madhya Pradesh State assembly in 1952 and served as the deputy speaker of Bilingual Bombay State from 23 November 1956 to 5 April 1957. He was elected from Kalmeshwar in 1957 elections to the Bombay State and in 1962 and 1967 to the Maharashtra Assembly. He was the Speaker of the Maharashtra Legislative Assembly between 22 March 1972 till 20 April 1977. Wankhede was also the mayor of Nagpur for three years. In 1967, he was a member of the Indian delegation that took part in the 22nd session of the United Nations General Assembly in New York City.

As Cricket Administrator
Wankhede was the President of the Board of Control for Cricket in India from 1980-81 to 1982-83, and the Vice president from 1972-73 to 1979-80. He led the Bombay Cricket Association from 1963-64 till his death. He also chaired various other sporting bodies. He was an agriculturist and businessman by profession.

The Bombay Cricket Association (BCA) had persistent disputes with the Cricket Club of India over ticketing revenues from Brabourne Stadium, which is owned by CCI. After a particularly bitter dispute in the early 1970s, the BCA decided to build a stadium of its own in Mumbai. Built under his leadership, it is now named after him as Wankhede Stadium, and is a prominent international cricketing venue.

References
 Obituary in Indian Cricket 1988
 Obituary in ACSSI almanack 1988

1914 births
1988 deaths
Wankhede, S.K.
Politicians from Nagpur
Maharashtra MLAs 1960–1962
Maharashtra MLAs 1962–1967
Maharashtra MLAs 1967–1972
Maharashtra MLAs 1972–1978
Marathi politicians
Mayors of Nagpur
Madhya Pradesh MLAs 1952–1957
Speakers of the Maharashtra Legislative Assembly
Indian independence activists from Maharashtra
Presidents of the Board of Control for Cricket in India
Bombay State MLAs 1957–1960